Fabian Rieder (born 16 February 2002) is a Swiss professional footballer who plays as a midfielder for Young Boys and the Switzerland national team.

Club career
Rieder was born in Koppigen, and is a youth product of the academy of Young Boys. He made his professional debut with Young Boys in a 0–0 Swiss Super League tie with Servette on 17 October 2020. He made his first Continental appearance with Young Boys in a 1–2 defeat to Roma in the Europa League on 22 October 2020. He played in all six of Young Boys UEFA Champions League group stage matches in the 21–22 season, scoring his first continental goal in a 1–1 draw with Manchester United at Old Trafford.

Career statistics

Club

References

External links
 
 SFL Profile
 SFL U16
 SFL U17
 SFL U19

2002 births
Living people
People from Emmental District
Swiss men's footballers
Switzerland youth international footballers
Association football midfielders
Swiss Super League players
BSC Young Boys players
2022 FIFA World Cup players
Sportspeople from the canton of Bern